Chris Blair may refer to:
 Chris Blair (badminton)
 Chris Blair (sportscaster)
 Chris Blair (rugby league)